Colin Rattigan (born 12 November 1961) is a British bobsledder and long jumper. He competed at the 1988 Winter Olympics and the 1992 Winter Olympics. He won the 1981 national long jump title.

References

External links
 

1961 births
Living people
British male long jumpers
British male bobsledders
Olympic bobsledders of Great Britain
Bobsledders at the 1988 Winter Olympics
Bobsledders at the 1992 Winter Olympics
Jamaican emigrants to the United Kingdom